Dabhadi may refer to:

 Dabhadi, Dahanu, a village in Maharashtra, India
 Dabhadi, Malegaon, a village in Maharashtra, India